In the United States, a film's box office gross in its second weekend of theatrical release is one of several factors used to predict overall box office performance. Most films experience a decline in box office gross in their second weekend, but a significant decline often indicates a subpar box office performance for the rest of a film's theatrical run. Some films are exceptions in that they perform better in their second weekend of release than on opening weekend.

Second-weekend drop

During a film's theatrical run, its box office performance generally declines from weekend to weekend. In addition to the film's opening-weekend gross, the percentage of the change between the opening weekend and the second weekend is used as a gauge for a film's commercial success. Assuming that the number of theaters stays the same, a normal drop in box office gross from the first weekend to the second would be 40%. A drop of greater than 60% indicates a weak future performance. Horror films are susceptible to having large drops in the second weekend and beyond even after a strong opening weekend. Chris Anderson, in his 2008 book The Long Tail: Why the Future of Business Is Selling Less of More, said twenty years prior, the average film experienced a second weekend drop of less than 30% and that the contemporary drop was now around 50%. Anderson ascribed the change to moviegoers being able to better identify mediocre and bad films through more information, both from more reviews and greater word-of-mouth. Slate in 2012 also reported a progressively increasing second weekend drop over the course of the last several decades. In the 1980s, the average second weekend drop was 15.7%. The 1990s saw the drop gradually climb to 21.5%, but by 2012 this had escalated all the way up to 49.1%. A lack of venues is usually not a factor as theaters have an obligation to show a film for at least two weeks.

The Los Angeles Times said the second-weekend drop was seasonal in the United States. Between May and July, the country's summer season, films have more significant drops than during the rest of the year. It reported that in May 2014, three opening blockbuster films—The Amazing Spider-Man 2, Godzilla, and X-Men: Days of Future Past—all had drops of over 60% where films earlier in the 21st century rarely had drops that steep. The newspaper cited possible reasons for the drops: that the films did not "inspire long-term moviegoing", and that alternative platforms such as Redbox, Netflix, and video on demand attracted film audiences who missed a film's opening weekend. The Hollywood Reporter said in 2017, "Generally speaking, a superhero film can fall 60 percent," highlighting Wonder Womans second-weekend drop of 45% as scant compared to others in the genre. In 2019, Dark Phoenix set a new record for the biggest second-weekend box office drop for a superhero film with 72.6%. Specific weekends during the year are known for poor box office and may lead to large drops, such as the first weekend of December following Thanksgiving when consumers begin shopping, and Super Bowl weekend.

The box office website Box Office Mojo ranks the following films by biggest second weekend drops during their wide release in the United States, which means screening in at least . The website bases its ranking on box office performance data from 1982 onward.

The 2012 family film The Oogieloves in the Big Balloon Adventure, though not in wide release, set a record for biggest second-weekend drop.

Second-weekend increases and smallest drops

An increase in a film's box office gross in its second weekend, provided that the number of theaters did not grow substantially, is considered exceptional.

Box Office Mojo reported in 2018 that out of over  films that were assessed, only 208 (or around 4%) saw an increased gross in their second weekend. Nearly every film to increase its gross in its second weekend benefitted from a holiday boosting attendance, with the vast majority having a second weekend falling on Christmas or New Year's, often the most-attended single week of the year; Memorial Day and Thanksgiving also boost attendance.

The top ten are listed below:

Among films to open in over 3,000 theaters without a holiday to benefit their second weekend, 2011's Puss in Boots posted the best hold, falling only 3%, while the 6.4% drop for 2018's Crazy Rich Asians was the best for both a live-action and adult-skewing film. The following films had the strongest second weekend holds without the benefit of a holiday:

See also

List of highest-grossing second weekends for films
List of highest-grossing openings for films
List of highest-grossing openings for animated films

References

External links
Will 'Fantastic Four' Take One Of The Biggest 2nd Weekend Drops Ever For A Comic Book Film? at Forbes, August 14, 2015
Box-Office Analysis: 'Suicide Squad' and the Summer of Steep Second-Week Drops at The Hollywood Reporter, August 15, 2016

Film box office